Kurt Hipper (8 November 1932 – 10 February 2009) was a West German rower who represented the United Team of Germany. He competed at the 1956 Summer Olympics in Melbourne with the men's double sculls where they came fourth. He later emigrated to South Africa and was the country's representative of the International Rowing Federation (FISA).

References

1932 births
2009 deaths
West German male rowers
Olympic rowers of the United Team of Germany
Rowers at the 1956 Summer Olympics
Rowers from Zürich
European Rowing Championships medalists
20th-century German people